Riverton Township may refer to the following places in the U.S. state of Iowa:

 Riverton Township, Clay County, Iowa
 Riverton Township, Floyd County, Iowa
 Riverton Township, Fremont County, Iowa

See also
Riverton Township (disambiguation)

Iowa township disambiguation pages